Elchin Asadov (born 12 February 1987) is an Azerbaijani racing cyclist, who currently rides for UCI Continental team . He rode at the 2014 UCI Road World Championships.

Major results

2012
 National Road Championships
1st  Time trial
2nd Road race
 6th Overall Tour of Trakya
2013
 National Road Championships
1st  Time trial
3rd Road race
 6th Overall Jelajah Malaysia
2014
 National Road Championships
1st  Time trial
1st  Road race
2015
 National Road Championships
2nd Time trial
2nd Road race
2016
 National Road Championships
1st  Time trial
3rd Road race
 6th Odessa Grand Prix
 7th UAE Cup
 9th Tour de Ribas
2017
 1st  Time trial, National Road Championships
 1st Stage 7 Tour du Maroc
 3rd Tour de Ribas
 5th Minsk Cup
 6th Odessa Grand Prix
 7th Horizon Park Race for Peace
 9th Horizon Park Race Maidan
2018
 National Road Championships
1st  Time trial
3rd Road race
 6th Overall Tour of Fatih Sultan Mehmet
2019
 National Road Championships
1st  Time trial
1st  Road race
 1st Stage 1 Tour of Peninsular
 Challenge du Prince
2nd Trophée de l'Anniversaire
3rd Trophée de la Maison Royale
9th Trophée Princier
 5th Bursa Orhangazi Race
 5th Grand Prix Velo Erciyes
 7th Overall Tour of Mevlana
 7th Overall Tour of Peninsular
 7th Horizon Park Race for Peace
 8th Bursa Yıldırım Bayezıt Race
 8th Horizon Park Race Classic
 10th Overall Tour of Mesopotamia
 10th Overall Tour of Black Sea
 10th Chabany Race
2020
 3rd Grand Prix Velo Erciyes
2022
 National Road Championships
1st  Time trial
1st  Road race
 4th Grand Prix Yahyalı 
 5th Overall Tour of Albania 
 7th Islamic Solidarity Games ME - Road Race 
 9th Grand Prix Erciyes 
 9th Grand Prix Develi 
 10th Grand Prix Kayseri 
 10th Grand Prix Kapuzbaşı

References

External links

1987 births
Living people
Azerbaijani male cyclists
People from Füzuli
European Games competitors for Azerbaijan
Cyclists at the 2015 European Games
Cyclists at the 2019 European Games
Olympic cyclists of Azerbaijan
Cyclists at the 2020 Summer Olympics
20th-century Azerbaijani people
21st-century Azerbaijani people